Hadiqat Al Akhbar (The News Garden in English) is the first daily newspaper of Lebanon which was launched in 1858. From 1858 to 1958 there were nearly 200 newspapers in the country. Prior to 1963 the number of newspapers was more than 400. However, the number reduced to 53 due to the 1963 press law.

Censorship of the press in the country occurred during the Ottoman era. It was also frequent in 1976 following the intervention of Syrian military in the Lebanese Civil War on behalf of Maronite Christians. As of 2012, the newspapers were being published in three major languages of Arabic, English and French and there were 12 Arabic dailies.

The following is a list of well-known newspapers published in Lebanon.

Daily newspapers
All published in Beirut

In Arabic

An-Nahar 
Ad-Diyar 
Al Akhbar 
Al Binaa 
Al Joumhouria  
Al Liwaa 
Al Amal 
Al Anbaa (defunct) 
Al Anwar (defunct) 
 Al Arz (defunct) 
Al Balad  (defunct)
Al Bayrak (defunct) 
Al Ittihad (defunct) 
Al Muharrir (defunct) 
Al-Mustaqbal (defunct)
 Al Nida (defunct)
 As-Safa (defunct) 
As-Safir (defunct) 
El Shark 
Telegraph Beirut (defunct)
Akhbar SMB

In Armenian
Ararad 
Aztag 
Zartonk 
Ayk (defunct)
Nida Al-Watan

In English
Al Akhbar (suspended)
Lebanon Daily Star  
Ike (defunct)

In French
Al Balad en français (defunct)
L'Orient-Le Jour
 Syrie (defunct)
 Le Soir (defunct)
 Le Reveil (defunct)

Lebanese non-daily newspapers

In Arabic
Al-Intiqad (Beirut)
Al-Kalima  (Zahlé)
At-Tadamon (Tripoli)
Hamzat Wassel (Beirut, Tripoli)
 Lisan al Hal
Asharara
Ila-l-Amam (defunct)

In English
Monday Morning (defunct)

Lebanese online news portals (Arabic, French and English )
The961.com 
Daily beirut 
Alankabout 
Iloubnan.info
Lebanon24
Tayyar.org (Disclosure: Owned by the FPM political party)
Lebanon Debate
Lebanon Files
LibanVision
Lebanonwire
Naharnet
NOW Lebanon
Ya Libnan
Akhbar SMB موقع شباب الملعب البلدي الأخباري
Ebaldati
Almodon
jadidouna news*

See also
List of magazines in Lebanon

References

 
Lebanon
Newspapers